Siilinjärvi is a municipality of Finland. Another neighbour municipality with Kuopio is Lapinlahti. The name, in Finnish, apparently translates literally as "Hedgehog's Lake", although its etymology actually stems from a Sámi word meaning winter dwelling. Lakes are essential part of the geography of Siilinjärvi. There are 123 lakes, and the biggest of them are Kallavesi and Juurusvesi–Akonvesi. Water area is 106.85 km2, which is 21% of the whole area of Siilinjärvi.

The median age is relatively low; 23% of the population are under 15 years old. Siilinjärvi has eleven elementary schools and two secondary schools (one is located in Suininlahti and one downtown).

The Kuopio Airport is located in the village of Rissala in Siilinjärvi along the Highway 9. The airport is also the home of the Karelian Air Command and the 31st Squadron of the Finnish Air Force.

Siilinjärvi is the birthplace of politician and former prime minister of Finland and European Commissioner Jyrki Katainen.

Economy

The main sources of income are services and industry. One of the most important employers in Siilinjärvi is Siilinjärvi apatite mine owned by Yara International. The other largest companies in Siilinjärvi are Yara International's factory and apatite mine, Lujabetoni Oy, Hydroline Oy, Recreational Pool Fontanella and Spa Hotel Kunnonpaikka. 5% of jobs are in primary production, 29% in industry and construction and 66% in services. Unemployment figures are the lowest in North Savonia, averaging 9,4% in 2016, while at the same time the average unemployment rate in North Savonia was 13,4% and in the whole country 13,2%.

Siilinjärvi's income tax rate in 2017 was 21,25.

Services

Energy production and water supply
The use of district heating has increased in recent years. Most of the district heat is produced from the Yara plant's process waste heat and from Savon Voima's Tiprusniemi bioheat plant. At the Tiprusniemi bioheat center, heat is produced with domestic wood fuel. In addition, Sulkavantie has a LPG back-up and peak heating center.

In Siilinjärvi, groundwater is used as raw water, which is obtained from three groundwater intakes, two of which are located in the church village and one in the Toivala-Vuorela area. In addition to the municipal water supply plant, there are 15 water cooperatives in the municipality's sparsely populated areas.

Fire and rescue services
There are two fire stations in the Siilinjärvi municipality, the North Savonia Rescue Department station and the Yara TPK station. Siilinjärvi's main fire station is located in Simonsalo at Sulkavantie 6, a few minutes' drive from the center of Siilinjärvi. The station has a 24-hour on-call service. Station 15 houses an inspection car PS 020, a fire truck PS 151, a fire truck PS 1512, a tank truck PS 153, a crew transport, an off-road and boat tractor PS 157, and a snowmobile and boat. Yara TPK has a fire truck PS 191 and a boat. In addition, it has been proposed to build a third fire station in Siilinjärvi near the Vuorela residential area.

Culture
A local newspaper called Uutis-Jousi is published in Siilinjärvi. Siilinjärvi also has its own library.

Food
In the 1980s, each of Savonia's then municipalities voted for its own title dishes. The traditional food of Siilinjärvi was a cockscomb, a potato gruel and a red berry kissel with whipped cream.

Notable people
 Katri-Helena Eskelinen (1925–2014), Finnish politician
 Jessica Grabowsky (born 1980), Finnish actress
 Ilkka Herola (born 1995), Finnish skier
 Jyrki Katainen (born 1971), Finnish politician
 Sanni Leinonen (born 1989), Finnish alpine skier
 Eetu Luostarinen (born 1998), Finnish ice hockey player
 MC Raaka Pee (born 1980), Finnish musician
 Topi Piipponen (born 1997), Finnish professional ice hockey player
 Kimmo Savolainen (born 1974), Finnish ski jumper

International relations

Twin towns — Sister cities
Siilinjärvi is twinned with:

  Sunne, Sweden  
  Elverum, Norway
  Haslev, Denmark  
  Hajdúböszörmény, Hungary
  Kamennogorsk, Russia
  Amberg, Germany

See also
 Finnish national road 5 (E63)
 Lake Kallavesi
 Kuopio Airport
 Siilinjärvi Football Club

References

External links

 Municipality of Siilinjärvi – Official website
 Kasurila ski resort
 Tarina Golf

 
Mining towns in Finland
Populated places established in 1925